Adler's gecko (Gekko adleri) is a species of lizard in the family Gekkonidae. The species is native to southern China and northern Vietnam.

Etymology
The specific name, adleri, is in honor of American herpetologist Kraig Adler.

Geographic range
G. adleri is found in Guangxi Zhuang Autonomous Region, China, and in Cao Bang Province, Vietnam.

Description
G. adleri is moderate-sized for its genus.

Habitat
The preferred natural habitat of G. adleri is forest.

References

Further reading
Nguyen TQ, Wang Y, Yang J, Lehmann T, Le MD, Ziegler T, Bonkowski M (2013). "A new species of the Gekko japonicus group (Squamata: Sauria: Gekkonidae) from the border region between China and Vietnam". Zootaxa 3652 (5): 501–518. (Gekko adleri, new species).

Gekko
Reptiles described in 2013
Reptiles of China
Reptiles of Vietnam